Lalmohan is an upazila of Bhola District in the Division of Barisal, Bangladesh.

Geography 
It has a total area of 396.24 km2. Postal code: 8330. The upazila is bounded by Burhanuddin and Tazumuddin upazilas on the north, Char Fasson upazila on the south, Manpura upazila on the east, Dashmina and Bauphal upazilas on the west.

The rivers Tentulia, Betua, and Boalia; Debnath Beel, Gatiar and Bhutar Canals, Shahbazpur Channel are notable water bodies here.

Demographics 

According to the 2011 Bangladesh census, Lalmohan Upazila had 60,988 households and a population of 283,889, 12.7% of whom lived in urban areas. 12.2% of the population was under the age of 5. The literacy rate (age 7 and over) was 40.0%, compared to the national average of 51.8%.

Administration 
Lalmohan, primarily formed as a Thana in 1919, was turned into an upazila in 1983.

The Upazila is divided into Lalmohan  Municipality and nine union parishads: Badarpur, Charbhuta, Dholigournagar, Farajgonj, Kalma, Lalmohan, Lord Hardinge, Paschim Char Umed, and Ramagonj. The union parishads are subdivided into 53 mauzas and 78 villages.

See also 
Upazilas of Bangladesh
Districts of Bangladesh
Divisions of Bangladesh

References 

Upazilas of Bhola District